Erdene-Ochiriin Ganzorig (born 27 September 1987) is a Mongolian international footballer. He has appeared twice for the Mongolia national football team.

References

1987 births
Mongolian footballers
Living people
Association football forwards
Mongolia international footballers